South Luangwa National Park  is in eastern Zambia, the southernmost of three national parks in the valley of the Luangwa River. It is a world-renowned wildlife haven which is known to locals simply as "the South Park." Concentrations of game along the meandering Luangwa River and its lagoons are amongst the most intense in Africa. The river teems with hippo and crocodile and provides a lifeline for one of the greatest diversities of habitat and wildlife, supporting more than 60 species of mammals and over 400 species of birds. It marks the end of the Great Rift Valley.

It supports large populations of Thornicroft's giraffe, and herds of elephants and Cape buffaloes often several hundred strong. It is one of the best-known national parks in Africa for walking safaris. Founded as a game reserve in 1938, it became a national park in 1972 and now covers 9,050 km2.

The Park is unfenced and bordered to the west by a steep escarpment and to the east by the Luangwa River. The Luangwa Valley lies at the tail end of the Great African Rift Valley system, which extends 4,000 km all the way from the Red Sea down to the Pungwe River mouth in Mozambique.

The Muchinga Escarpment in Northern and Central Provinces forms the park's western or north-western boundary. It slopes down from there to the river, lying mostly on its western bank. The eastern bank of the river is in Eastern Province, and as access to the park is only from that side, it is usually thought of as being wholly in Eastern Province.

History 
It was initially created as Luangwa Game Reserve in 1904. British conservationist Norman Carr was influential in setting up the South Luangwa National Park. A man ahead of his time, Norman Carr broke the mould of track-and-hunt safari and created conservation based tourism.

In the 1950s, he persuaded the Paramount Chief to set aside a portion of tribal land as a Game Reserve and built the first game viewing camp open to the public in Northern Rhodesia (now Zambia). Guests shot with cameras and not rifles; thus the South Luangwa became the home of the photographic and walking safari.  Profits from this remote photographic camp in the bush went back into community.

Background

The park spans two eco-regions, both of them woodland savannah, distinguished by the dominant tree: Southern Miombo woodlands cover the higher slopes of the valley, while Zambezian and Mopane woodlands cover the bottom of the valley. The Mopane tree tolerates the higher temperatures and lower rainfall found at lower elevations than miombo trees which are found on the higher plateau. Within these woodland savannahs are larger patches of grassland, so that grazers such as zebra and leaf browsers such as giraffe are found in profusion in the same areas. Patches of flooded grassland habitats (floodplains) are found close to the river, on which hippopotamus graze at night. Their dung released into the river fertilises its waters and sustains the fish population which in turn sustains the crocodiles.

The Luangwa valley, continued to the west by the Lunsemfwa River valley, contains some varieties of animals such as Cookson's wildebeest and Crawshay's zebra which are endemic or near-endemic to the valley. It also represents something of a natural barrier to human migration and transport, no roads cross it and this has helped conserve its wildlife.

Although this park is generally well-protected from poaching, its black rhinos were extirpated by 1987, and the elephant population has been under serious pressure at times.

The main settlement of the park is actually outside its eastern boundary at Mfuwe, and it has an airport which has flights to Lusaka, the Lower Zambezi and Lilongwe in Malawi.

Since 2005, the protected area is considered a Lion Conservation Unit together with North Luangwa National Park.

See also

 Wildlife of Zambia
 National parks in Zambia

References

External links

 South Luangwa National Park website

National parks of Zambia
Geography of Eastern Province, Zambia
Geography of Northern Province, Zambia
Miombo
Tourist attractions in Eastern Province, Zambia
Tourist attractions in Northern Province, Zambia
Protected areas established in 1938
Important Bird Areas of Zambia
Central Zambezian miombo woodlands